Heaven and Earth is the fourth studio album by American jazz saxophonist Kamasi Washington. It was released on June 22, 2018, through Young Turks Recordings. Both CD and LP versions of the album contain an extra disc called "The Choice" which is hidden within a closed part of the packaging which must be cut open to access the disc. The Choice was released digitally as a separate LP on June 29, 2018.

Critical reception

On Metacritic, which assigns a normalized rating out of 100 to reviews from critics, the album received an average score of 86, which indicates "universal acclaim", based on 22 reviews.

AllMusic critic Thom Jurek described the album as " a major dose of Afro-Futurism", and observed: "Heaven and Earth is more a refinement of the ideas expressed on The Epic than an entirely new paradigm. There is less wandering, more focus, more inquiry and directed movement, as well as an abundance of colorful tonal and harmonic contrasts. More than anything else, it establishes Washington as a composer and arranger of dizzying potential and still underscores his twin rep as a soloist and jazz conceptualist." Adam Turner-Heffer of Drowned in Sound described the album as "another incredible, mind-opening exploration into Washington’s ideas of creation in the universe".

The Guardian critic Alexis Petridis named it album of the week and wrote: "The US saxophonist has found his time and it is now: this excellent album connects politics with the jazz of the past to create an angrily inclusive new vision...On Heaven and Earth, Washington continues to explore a sweet spot between artistry and approachability. Whether his success will lead audiences to further explore music that usually exists on the fringes is an interesting question. What is more certain is the quality and accessibility of his own music". Nate Chinen of Pitchfork awarded the album "Best New Music", writing, "Far and away the strongest musical statement of his career, it’s also an exercise in contrast, if not outright contradiction ... Washington remains enamored of the jazz tradition even as he insists on reshaping it. The heart of the complaint against him in jazz circles is his limited range as an improviser. He has no real instinct for developing harmonic momentum in a solo, and he slips too often into pentatonic pattern-work, as if an algorithm were kicking in. On the other hand, Washington’s strengths have never been clearer. His sound is sinewy and centered, his rhythmic footing sure. And he’s a catharsis engine who also knows when to shrewdly dial it back"

Rolling Stone's Hank Shteamer wrote, "Washington is less a vanguardist than a crafty, retro-minded synthesist in love with a large canvas. His latest – shorter than his prior full-length, but still clocking in at close to two and a half hours – is a sprawling, eclectic set that ranges from the slightly tepid to the truly transcendent...If some tracks hit harder than others, Washington’s obsession with ear-catching detail is impressive throughout. These two discs are filled with memorable flourishes". Consequence of Sound's Tyler Clark wrote, "Kamasi Washington capitalizes on both his newfound fame and his journeyman work ethic to produce a follow-up that’s more intimate and just as daring at the same time. Listening to Heaven & Earth will give you a better sense of Washington, the man and the artist, as well as the moods and textures of the America in which he resides. It’ll also give you the chance to say you heard him when he was still, it seems, on the ascent towards the heights of his considerable powers". In The New York Times, Giovanni Rossonello wrote, "Mr. Washington still suffers gentle disdain from some in New York, where the international jazz scene is unofficially headquartered. It’s a town he’s never felt obligated to join — or to beat. A common criticism is that his music isn’t doing anything new — it’s a classic old complaint, and it doesn’t stick here ... On Heaven and Earth there’s a balance between big-stroke conceptualism — the first CD, “Earth,” is meant to represent worldly preoccupations; the second, “Heaven,” explores utopian thought — and the workmanlike reality of collaboration. The two collections don't vary significantly in terms of sound; instead, they're a testament to the sturdy rapport of Mr. Washington's ensemble, made up of Los Angeles musicians who have been playing together for years".

Track listing

Personnel
Kamasi Washington – tenor saxophone
Dontae Winslow – trumpet
Ryan Porter – trombone
Cameron Graves – piano
Brandon Coleman – keyboards, organ, vocoder
Miles Mosley – bass. electric bass
Ronald Bruner Jr. – drums
Tony Austin – drums, percussion
Allakoi Peete, Kahlil Cummings – percussion
Orchestra:
Rickey Washington – flute
Greg Martin – oboe
Tracy Wannomae – clarinet
Amber Joy Wyman – bassoon
Amy Sanchez, Laura Brenes – French horn
Marc T. Bolin – tuba
Jen Simone, Martino, Paul Jacob Cartwright, Ray Suen, Reiko Nakano, Rocio Marron, Yvette Devereaux, Yvette Holzwarth – violin
Brittany Cotto, Caroline Buckman, Chad Jackson, Landon Jones, Molly Rogers, Morgan Matadero, Tom Lea – viola
Adrienne Woods, Ginger Murphy, Peter PT Jacobson – cello
Dominic Thiroux – bass
Dwight Trible, Matachi Nwosu, Patrice Quinn, Steven Wayne – lead vocals
Amaya Washington, Angelo D. Johnson Jr., Cameron Graves, Dawn Norfleet, Dustin W. Warren, Jackie Fiske, Mashica Winslowdynasty, Nia Andrews, Patrice Quinn, Sonnet Simmons, Steven Wayne, Taylor Graves, Thalma de Freitas – choir

Additional musicians
Chris Gray – trumpet
Terrace Martin – alto saxophone
Rickey Washington – tenor saxophone
Jamael Dean – piano
Carlos del Puerto, Gabe Noel – bass
Thundercat, Gabe Noel – electric bass
Chris Dave, Jonathan Pinson, Robert Searight, Robert Miller – drums

Charts

Weekly charts

Year-end charts

References

2018 albums
Kamasi Washington albums
Young Turks (record label) albums
Albums recorded at Electro-Vox Recording Studios